Nefertiabet (nfrt-jꜣbt; "Beautiful One of the East") was an ancient Egyptian princess of the 4th Dynasty. She was possibly a daughter of Pharaoh Khufu.

Tomb
Her tomb at Giza is known (G 1225). The mastaba is about 24.25 x 11.05 m. in size.

A statue of her, now in Munich, probably originates from her tomb. There is a well-known slab stela depicting the princess that is now in the Louvre. Nefertiabet is shown seated facing right. She is depicted with a long wig and a panther-skin garment. An offering table in front of her bears reeds, as is common, indicating "[the products of the] field", as well as sundry other foodstuffs. Under the table offerings are depicted including linen and ointment on the left, and on the right offerings of bread, beer, oryx, and bull. On the right of the slab a linen list is depicted.

The tomb originally contained one shaft, which contained the burial of Nefertiabet. The shaft comprises a passage and a chamber. Fragments of a white limestone coffin with a flat lid were found. A canopic pit had been dug in one of the corners of the chamber. The chamber contained several bowls and jars. An annex with one additional burial shaft was added later, but was found emptied.

Sources

Princesses of the Fourth Dynasty of Egypt
26th-century BC women
Khufu